The Community Foundation of Northern Colorado is an independent philanthropic organization that serves the Northern Colorado community including Berthoud, Estes Park, Fort Collins, and Loveland.

Purpose
Like other community foundations, this a permanent nonprofit organization working in a specific geographic area to manage a collection of charitable funds. Donations to the funds are tax-deductible and grants  from the funds are distributed to nonprofits, schools, and churches. A Community Foundation operates by charging a modest annual fee on the funds it manages.

About
The Community Foundation's work to strengthen and sustain Northern Colorado keeps them connected with and accountable to Northern Colorado residents—past, present, and future. Every resident of Northern Colorado benefits from the legacy and strategic planning of previous generations.

Hundreds of individuals, families, businesses, and nonprofit organizations have established funds at the Community Foundation of Northern Colorado. They entrust their resources—in the form of cash, real estate, stock, estate gifts, and more—to the Community Foundation and depend on it to be the long-term steward of these assets.

History
In the fall of 1975,   Fort Collins, Colorado] was a small college town of approximately 60,000 people on the verge of major growth., and there was a need for a nonprofit organization to collect charitable contributions for local purposes. Initially, the foundation was called the Fort Collins Community Foundation before expanding to serve a greater Northern Colorado region. The Community Foundation of Northern Colorado grants out millions of dollars each year and has grown to more than $70 million in assets.

Community Foundation of Northern Colorado initiatives, funds, and projects
Community leaders and donors have used the foundation as a platform to launch and fund new initiatives such as UniverCity Connections,  Homeward 2020, FortZED, Veterans Plaza of Northern Colorado, and the Rialto Bridge Project. Memorial funds, large and small, have been established to carry on the memory of loved ones. The Foundation serves as the infrastructure for community projects such as  Inspiration Playground  and as the platform for launching new nonprofits like Project Smile and CHAMP.

References

1. "History". Community Foundation of Northern Colorado. Retrieved 2013-06-24

2. "2011 Annual Report". Community Foundation of Northern Colorado. Retrieved 2013-07-09

3. "Community Foundations". Council on Foundations. Retrieved 2013-07-09

4. "Heroism During High Park Fire Celebrated at This Year's Philanthropy Dinner". The Coloradoan. Retrieved 2013-07-25

5. "Community Foundations Know Their Local Needs". The Denver Post. Retrieved 2013-07-25

6. "Community Foundation Hold Annual Celebration". Northern Colorado Business Report. Retrieved 2013-07-25

7. "Manufacturing Firm Gift Puts Community Foundation Over $50M Mark". Northern Colorado Business Report. Retrieved 2013-07-25

Non-profit organizations based in Colorado
Community foundations based in the United States